This article is a summary of the year 2005 in Swiss music. For the generalized article on music in 2005, see 2005 in music.

In 2005 Swiss music, began to chart climb significantly. Audiences saw many chart debuts from both Swiss and international acts and saw two novelty songs share a combined total of over ten weeks at the singles chart number one spot. Internationally, the Swiss also saw Vanilla Ninja take the country to their best Eurovision Song Contest position in twelve years.

Chart summary 
The first Swiss Top 100 Singles Chart number one of 2005 was "Living to Love You" by Sarah Connor. The single was Connor's second Swiss number one and had entered the chart back in November 2004. However, a slump in sales following the rush for Christmas number one had allowed Connor to climb from No. 2 and take the accolade. The first album chart number one of the year was Robbie Williams' Greatest Hits.

Nu Pagadi's "Sweetest Poison" replaced Sarah Connor at the number one spot on January 9, having entered at No. 5 the week before. January 9 also saw no new entries in the Top 55 of the singles chart, with the highest being Global Deejays' post-Christmas offering at No. 56.

The MusicStars, a collaboration of participants from the reality television series of the same name, achieved the first of two number ones on January 30 with "Friends Forever". Meanwhile, in the album chart, Green Day made number one with American Idiot.

February 6 saw Schnappi's "Schnappi, das kleine Krokodil" climb to number one. The single featured a young German child singing about a small crocodile. The music video accompanying the song also featured a small crocodile on an adventure around the world. The single was immensely popular through its novelty value, and after making it to number one would stay there for another month.

February also saw number-one albums from Lovebugs and DJ Bobo, the latter having had huge success across Europe since the mid-1990s. Schnappi lost the top spot in the singles chart on March 13 to the MusicStars 'he' had taken it from, only to take it back the following week. The run at number one finally ended on April 10, after eight weeks total at the top spot. 50 Cent and Olivia's "Candy Shop" took over the spot, having a similarly long six-week run at number one.

Unlike the singles chart, the album chart had been a revolving door throughout March and early April, with several artists making number one, only to drop down the chart a week later. On April 17 DJ Antoine's The Black Album made number one. The album would stay there for two weeks and was Antoine's fifth top-ten album.

Salome Clausen dethroned 50 Cent on May 15. The MusicStars contestant's debut single "Gumpu" would be the song to do it, staying at number one until June 5, when the internationally successful Akon's "Lonely" took the spot off her. Including the MusicStars releases, Salome had already been, by the end of the first half of 2005, at number one three times.

Meanwhile, on May 21, Vanilla Ninja represented Switzerland at the Eurovision Song Contest 2005. The group comfortably made it through the May 19 semi-finals, and eventually finished 8th in the contest, despite leading at several points during the competition. The girl group had before the contest had success across Central Europe, having been born in Estonia. The 8th place was a huge boost for Switzerland in the Eurovision, with it becoming their best place since 1993 (see ESC1993). The song the girls performed, "Cool Vibes", was released on June 12. Despite the publicity of competing in the contest and the controversy of not being Swiss and having a member who had just turned 16 (Triinu Kivilaan), the single only made it to a peak of No. 17 in the charts.

Although Bruce Springsteen's Devils and Dust brought some stability to the top of the album chart throughout May, the Top 100 Albums still continued to be quicker-changing than the Top 100 Singles. June saw Gorillaz, The Black Eyed Peas, Gotthard and eventually Coldplay make number one in the album chart. Only the latter, however, would stay there for more than one week. X&Y entered on June 26, and remained at number one until August 7 – A seven-week run not bettered at any time in 2005.

Akon lost the number one spot after his third week at number one, dropping it to the second chart-topping novelty act of the year, the Crazy Frog. Unlike Schnappi, the Crazy Frog had already been made well-known (but not necessarily popular) by its being sold as a ringtone. The single, "Axel F" (a cover of Harold Faltermeyer's 1985 hit), was the debut of the frog and easily passed Akon on July 3. This overtaking move (the Crazy Frog had entered on May 29 at #28) started a run of eleven weeks at number one, ending on September 18. Meanwhile, in the album chart, James Blunt replaced Coldplay at number one on August 14 with his debut Back To Bedlam album.

September 18 saw the first time since June that both the singles and album chart number ones changed simultaneously. Juanes replaced the Crazy Frog in the singles chart, and the Rolling Stones' A Bigger Bang replaced James Blunt in the album chart. Both lasted two weeks at the top of their respective charts, the Pussycat Dolls and Busta Rhymes' "Don't Cha" taking the Top 100 Singles top spot on October 2.

The Pussycat Dolls had already achieved success in the USA, and their debut single also achieved huge popularity in Switzerland. Their run at number one lasted until November when Melanie C replaced them. Meanwhile, in the album chart, the group Patent Ochsner enjoyed a three-week run in an otherwise inconsistent Autumn of 2005 for the album chart.

The hugely successful Madonna unsurprisingly made number one on November 20, with the release of her return single "Hung Up". A week later she replaced Eros Ramazzotti at the album chart top spot with Confessions on a Dance Floor. Although the album only lasted two weeks at number one, Madonna would see out the remainder of 2005 at the singles top spot, with there being little competition for Christmas number one. In fact, the highest new entry on December 25 was Robbie Williams' "Advertising Space", entering outside of the Top Ten at No. 11.

Robbie Williams would gain the Christmas Album Top 100 number one, though, with his album Intensive Care topping the chart for a second week.

Other events in 2005 
 In December 2005, the Swiss national broadcaster announced that Six4one will represent the country at the Eurovision Song Contest 2006. Six4one was put together for the sole purpose of representing Switzerland and was expected to disband afterward. The six individuals in the group were chosen at a casting session in November, and included Andreas Lundstedt (of Alcazar fame), Tinka (famous Balkan opera singer and TV celebrity), Liel (branded the "next Celine Dion") and Claudia D'Addio (the only Swiss member of the group, and a participant in the MusicStars show).
 On December 16, 2005, the official website of the Swiss charts, Hitparade.ch, celebrated its tenth birthday. The site had been started in 1995 by Steffen Hung and had eventually grown to be so popular that the official charts company adopted it as the official site of the Swiss music industry. Hitparade celebrated the milestone with several competitions and special birthday branding on its website.

Swiss charts

See also 
 2005 in music
 2005 in British music
 2005 in Irish music
 2005 in Norwegian music
 2005 in South Korean music
 2005 in country music
 2005 in classical music
 2005 in heavy metal music
 2005 in hip hop music
 2005 in jazz
 2005 in Latin music
 2005 in Switzerland
 Vanilla Ninja

References 
 Hitparade Chart Archive

External links 
 Swiss Charts official website (in English)
 Swiss Charts official website (in German)

Swiss Music, 2005 In
Swiss music